Tim Smyczek was the defending champion but lost in the semifinals to Michael Mmoh.

Darian King won the title after defeating Mmoh 7–6(7–2), 6–2 in the final.

Seeds

Draw

Finals

Top half

Bottom half

References
 Main draw
 Qualifying draw

2016 ATP Challenger Tour
2016 Singles